Michael Caine has been nominated for an Oscar six times, winning his first Academy Award for the 1986 film Hannah and Her Sisters, and his second in 1999 for The Cider House Rules, in both cases as a supporting actor. His performance in Educating Rita in 1983 earned him the BAFTA and Golden Globe Award for Best Actor. Caine is one of only two actors nominated for an Academy Award for acting in every decade from the 1960s to 2000s (the other one being Jack Nicholson); Laurence Olivier was also nominated for an acting Academy Award in five different decades, beginning in 1939 and ending in 1978, as has Paul Newman (1950s, '60s, '80s, '90s and 2000s) and Denzel Washington (1980s, '90s. 2000s, '10s and '20s). Caine appeared in seven films that were ranked in the BFI's 100 greatest British films of the 20th century.

He was appointed Commander of the Order of the British Empire (CBE) in the 1992 Queen's Birthday Honours and in the 2000 Birthday Honours he was knighted as Sir Maurice Micklewhite CBE by Queen Elizabeth II at Buckingham Palace. In a tribute to his background, he stated: "I was named after my father and I was knighted in his name because I love my father. I always kept my real name—I'm a very private and family-orientated person." In 2000 he received a BAFTA Academy Fellowship Award.

In 2008, Caine was awarded the prize for Outstanding Contribution to Showbusiness at the Variety Club Awards. On 5 January 2011 he was made a Commander of the Ordre des Arts et des Lettres by France's culture minister, Frédéric Mitterrand. In May 2012, Caine was awarded the Honorary Freedom of the London Borough of Southwark as a person of distinction and eminence of the borough.

Major associations

Academy Awards

BAFTA Awards

Golden Globe Awards

Screen Actors Guild Awards

Other awards and nominations

Bangkok International Film Festival Awards

British Independent Film Awards

Central Ohio Film Critics Association Awards

Chicago Film Critics Association Awards

Critics' Choice Movie Awards

Detroit Film Critics Society Awards

David di Donatello Awards

European Film Awards

Empire Awards

Evening Standard British Film Awards

Golden Raspberry Awards

Kansas City Film Critics Circle Awards

London Film Critics' Circle Awards

Los Angeles Film Critics Association Awards

National Board of Review Awards

National Society of Film Critics Awards

People's Choice Awards

Phoenix Film Critics Society Awards

Primetime Emmy Awards

San Francisco Film Critics Circle Awards

San Sebastián International Film Festival

Satellite Awards

Seattle Film Critics Awards

Scream Awards

Washington D.C. Area Film Critics Association Awards

References

Notes

Sources

External links
 

Caine, Michael